The 1990 Bristol City Council election took place on 3 May 1990 to elect members of Bristol City Council in England. This was on the same day as other local elections. One third of seats were up for election. There were by-elections in Brislington East and Easton. As Easton also had an election in the usual schedule, 2 seats were elected in that ward. There was a significant swing against the Liberal Democrats, largely as a result of the post-merger chaos that the party suffered.

Ward results

The change is calculated using the results when these actual seats were last contested, i.e. the 1986 election.

Ashley

Avonmouth

Bedminster

Bishopston

Brislington East

Cabot

Clifton

Cotham

Easton

Eastville

Filwood

Frome Vale

Henbury

Henleaze

Hillfields

Horfield

Kingsweston

Lawrence Hill

Lockleaze

Redland

Southmead

Southville

Stoke Bishop

Westbury-on-Trym

Sources
 Bristol Evening Post 4 May 1990

1990
1990 English local elections
1990s in Bristol